Billy Joiner (10 May 1938 - 2019), was an American professional boxer from Cincinnati, U.S.

Early life
Joiner was born in Cincinnati, Ohio, on 10 May 1938. His father was a former professional boxer, as was his uncle who had once knocked out Freddie Miller in a bout.

Amateur career
Joiner was the 1962 National Golden Gloves and National AAU Light-Heavyweight Champion and compiled an Amateur record of 86-6 (The Ring, March 1964), and won the National Golden Gloves with a win over Gerald McClure of Toledo, Ohio. He also fought Cassius Clay twice as an amateur between 1960-61. He made his professional debut in August 1962, stopping Jukius Dickins in two rounds.

Professional career
He was a promising heavyweight prospect in the 1960s who failed to live up to his promise. A slick boxer with little punch, Joiner is best remembered for lasting the distance with former world heavyweight champion Sonny Liston on March 28, 1969, during Liston's comeback. This was in fact their second fight. They'd fought in May the year before with Liston winning a seventh round stoppage.

He also fought (and lost) to top heavyweight contenders Zora Folley, Oscar Bonavena, Mac Foster, Alfredo Evangelista and Larry Holmes.

Later life
After retiring from the ring Joiner worked for thirty years with the Ohio State Highway Maintenance Department, finishing as a Superintendent.  He was also employed as an amateur boxing coach.

Death
Joiner died at the age of 81 in June 2019.

Professional boxing record

|-
|align="center" colspan=8|12 Wins (5 knockouts, 7 decisions), 13 Losses (5 knockouts, 8 decisions), 3 Draws
|-
| align="center" style="border-style: none none solid solid; background: #e3e3e3"|Result
| align="center" style="border-style: none none solid solid; background: #e3e3e3"|Record
| align="center" style="border-style: none none solid solid; background: #e3e3e3"|Opponent
| align="center" style="border-style: none none solid solid; background: #e3e3e3"|Type
| align="center" style="border-style: none none solid solid; background: #e3e3e3"|Round
| align="center" style="border-style: none none solid solid; background: #e3e3e3"|Date
| align="center" style="border-style: none none solid solid; background: #e3e3e3"|Location
| align="center" style="border-style: none none solid solid; background: #e3e3e3"|Notes
|-align=center
|Win
|
|align=left| Young Louis
|PTS
|10
|13/11/1981
|align=left| Northwest Activities Center, Detroit, Michigan
|align=left|
|-
|Loss
|
|align=left| Alfredo Evangelista
|KO
|1
|27/05/1978
|align=left| Leon, Spain
|align=left|
|-
|Win
|
|align=left| "King" Jim Fletcher
|TKO
|5
|19/08/1976
|align=left| Washoe Fairgrounds Pavilion, Reno, Nevada
|align=left|
|-
|Loss
|
|align=left| Oscar Bonavena
|UD
|10
|26/02/1976
|align=left| Reno, Nevada
|align=left|
|-
|Loss
|
|align=left| Larry Holmes
|TKO
|3
|20/12/1975
|align=left| Roberto Clemente Coliseum, Hato Rey
|align=left|
|-
|Loss
|
|align=left| Bernd August
|PTS
|8
|28/09/1973
|align=left| Berlin
|align=left|
|-
|Loss
|
|align=left| Mac Foster
|KO
|5
|29/07/1971
|align=left| Olympic Auditorium, Los Angeles, California
|align=left|
|-
|Loss
|
|align=left| Juergen Blin
|PTS
|10
|09/10/1970
|align=left| Hamburg
|align=left|
|-
|Loss
|
|align=left| Alvin Lewis
|UD
|10
|15/07/1970
|align=left| Madison Square Garden, New York City
|align=left|
|-
|Loss
|
|align=left| Zora Folley
|UD
|10
|05/11/1969
|align=left| Silver Slipper, Las Vegas, Nevada
|align=left|
|-
|Win
|
|align=left| Bob Cleroux
|SD
|10
|31/07/1969
|align=left| Paul Sauve Arena, Montreal, Quebec
|align=left|
|-
|Loss
|
|align=left| Sonny Liston
|UD
|10
|28/03/1969
|align=left| Kiel Auditorium, Saint Louis, Missouri
|align=left|
|-
|Loss
|
|align=left| Sonny Liston
|RTD
|7
|23/05/1968
|align=left| Olympic Auditorium, Los Angeles, California
|align=left|
|-
|Draw
|
|align=left| Chuck Leslie
|PTS
|10
|27/03/1968
|align=left| Silver Slipper, Las Vegas, Nevada
|align=left|
|-
|Draw
|
|align=left| Dante Cane
|PTS
|10
|12/02/1968
|align=left| Bologna, Emilia-Romagna
|align=left|
|-
|Draw
|
|align=left| Piero Tomasoni
|PTS
|10
|26/12/1967
|align=left| Brescia, Lombardy
|align=left|
|-
|Loss
|
|align=left| "King" Jim Fletcher
|PTS
|10
|04/12/1967
|align=left| Silver Slipper, Las Vegas, Nevada
|align=left|
|-
|Loss
|
|align=left| Hubert Hilton
|TKO
|9
|08/09/1966
|align=left| Freeport Stadium, Freeport, New York
|align=left|
|-
|Win
|
|align=left| Mert Brownfield
|KO
|2
|13/06/1966
|align=left| Cincinnati, Ohio
|align=left|
|-
|Win
|
|align=left| Lee Wallace Carr
|UD
|10
|13/11/1964
|align=left| Madison Square Garden, New York City
|align=left|
|-
|Loss
|
|align=left| Amos Johnson
|SD
|10
|11/09/1964
|align=left| Cleveland Arena, Cleveland, Ohio
|align=left|
|-
|Win
|
|align=left| Oron Johnson
|TKO
|8
|22/05/1964
|align=left| Cleveland Arena, Cleveland, Ohio
|align=left|
|-
|Win
|
|align=left| Harvey C. Jones
|UD
|8
|17/04/1964
|align=left| Cleveland Arena, Cleveland, Ohio
|align=left|
|-
|Win
|
|align=left| Lloyd Washington
|UD
|10
|11/03/1964
|align=left| Painesville Armory, Painesville, Ohio
|align=left|
|-
|Win
|
|align=left| Lou Bailey
|PTS
|10
|17/01/1964
|align=left| Cleveland Arena, Cleveland, Ohio
|align=left|
|-
|Win
|
|align=left| Amos Johnson
|PTS
|10
|19/11/1963
|align=left| Akron, Ohio
|align=left|
|-
|Win
|
|align=left| Marion Connor
|TKO
|5
|06/02/1963
|align=left| Canton Auditorium, Canton, Ohio
|align=left|
|-
|Win
|
|align=left| Julius Dickens
|KO
|2
|25/08/1962
|align=left| Madison Square Garden, New York City
|align=left|
|}

References

External links
 
 Billy Joiner embodies city's boxing legacy

1938 births
Boxers from Cincinnati
Winners of the United States Championship for amateur boxers
National Golden Gloves champions
Living people
American male boxers
Heavyweight boxers